Peter Milton (22 September 1928 – 8 August 2009) was an Australian politician. Born in London, England, he was educated at the University of Melbourne and served in the military from 1946 to 1949. On his return, he was assistant registrar at the University of Melbourne. In 1980, he was elected to the Australian House of Representatives as the Labor member for La Trobe. He held the seat until his defeat in 1990. He died of cancer on 8 August 2009 at his home in Northcote.

References

1928 births
2009 deaths
Australian Labor Party members of the Parliament of Australia
Members of the Australian House of Representatives for La Trobe
Members of the Australian House of Representatives
Deaths from cancer in Victoria (Australia)
20th-century Australian politicians
English emigrants to Australia